Blaikley is a surname. Notable people with the surname include:

Alan Blaikley (1940–2022), English songwriter and composer
Catherine Kaidyee Blaikley ( 1695–1771), American landowner and midwife

See also
Blackley (surname)
Blakeley (surname)